Champion Homes, or Champion Home Builders, is a mobile and modular home manufacturing company that operates as a subsidiary of the Skyline Champion Corporation. It is one of the largest modular homebuilders in North America. The company also provides factory-built housing to the United States and western Canada. Champion homes has been a publicly held company for over 40 years, with shares listed on the New York Stock Exchange from 1995 to 2010.

Products

Champion Homes, a division of Champion Enterprise Holdings LLC, is primarily a manufacturer of mobile and modular homes, but they have also built travel trailers, RVs, campers, and commercial buses. Furthermore, Champion Homes has built modular homes for government applications. Champion Homes has acquired many brand names, including Caledonian Building Systems, Carolina Building Solutions, Commander, Dutch, Fortune, Highland Manufacturing, Homes of Merit, Moduline, New Era, New Image, North American, Redman, Silvercrest, SRI, Summit Crest and Titan. As of 2007 Champion Home Builders built over 1,000 homes a month, up from about 10 a month during their first year.. As of 2019 Champion Homes had built over 1,700,000 of factory-built homes, modular and park model homes across North America.

History

Champion Homes was founded in 1953 as a single manufacturing facility in the small town of Dryden in rural Michigan by Walter W. Clark and Henry E. George.

 In 2005, Champion was the first manufacturer to build privatized modular housing for the military.
 In 2010, Champion filed for bankruptcy and was acquired by an investor group led by Centerbridge Partners, MAK Capital Fund LP and Sankaty Advisors and company lenders led by Credit Suisse. The company later recovered.

Today

Champion Homes is still headquartered in Michigan, but in Troy, Michigan rather than Dryden, and has over 30 manufacturing facilities located across the United States and Europe. Worldwide, Champion Homes employs over 5,000 people.

In June 2018 Champion Enterprises Holdings LLC combined with Skyline Corporation to form the Skyline Champion Corporation. Champion Homes now operates as a subsidiary of the Skyline Corporation. Skyline Corporation is listed on the NYSE under ticker "SKY."

References

External links
 Official website
Company overview at official website

Manufactured home manufacturers
Manufacturing companies based in Michigan
1953 establishments in Michigan
Manufacturing companies established in 1953